The National Syndicate of Tunisian Journalists (Arabic: النقابة_الوطنية_للصحفيين_التونسيين, French: Syndicat National des Journalistes Tunisiens, or SNJT) is an independent, non-governmental professional association that defends the right of free speech and overall rights of journalists in Tunisia.

See also 

 Tunisian General Labor Union
 Tunis Afrique Presse

References 
 

2008 establishments in Tunisia
Organisations based in Tunisia
Journalism organizations